Sylke Luding (born 1 December 1968) is a former East German long track speed skater, who was active between 1982 and 1991.

Junior level
As a junior she won the bronze medal at the 1987 World Junior Speed Skating Championships. At the end of the season she set three world records during an international competition between East Germany and the Soviet Union. She set twice the 500 metre world record. Besides of that she set the sprint classification world record. For several years skaters struggled with this time. The record was finally broken in November 1990 by Kyoko Shimazaki.

Senior level
She had three top-8 classifications at the World Cups. Due to an injury she couldn’t start at  events. She also competed at other international competitions.

She won three bronze medals at the German Single Distance Championships in the 500 metres (2x) and 1000 metres (1x). Between 1985 and 1990 she had at least 10 starts at national championships. She had tough skating competition from her fellow teammates in SC Einheit Dresden which was in the world top class from the skaters Karin Kania (olympic champion), Andrea Ehrig (olympic champion), Christa Rothenburger (olympic champion), Skadi Walter (olympic top-5), Carola Bürger and Heike Pöhland.

Records

Personal records

Family and coach
Her mental coach was Olympic medalist in both speed skating and cycling Christa Rothenburger.

Luding is the daughter of sprint speed skating coach Ernst Luding of his first marriage. Later he married with Christa Rothenburger.

References

External links 
 

1968 births
Place of birth missing (living people)
German female speed skaters
Living people